Vozhdovo is a village in Chernoochene Municipality, in Kardzhali Province, in southern-central Bulgaria. It covers an area of 0.821 square kilometres and as of 2007 it had a population of 933 people. Most people are Turkish and the main profession is Islam.

References

Villages in Kardzhali Province